Rock Alan Lee (born May 1, 1955 in La Jolla, California) is a retired professional basketball center who played one season in the National Basketball Association (NBA) as a member of the San Diego Clippers during the 1981–82 season. He attended the University of California and San Diego State University.

External links
 

1955 births
Living people
American men's basketball players
Basketball players from California
California Golden Bears men's basketball players
Centers (basketball)
People from La Jolla, San Diego
San Diego Clippers players
San Diego State Aztecs men's basketball players
Undrafted National Basketball Association players